Jerusalem Day is an Israeli national holiday that commemorates the "reunification" of East Jerusalem (including the Old City) with West Jerusalem following the Six-Day War of 1967, which saw Israel occupy East Jerusalem and the West Bank, effectively annexing the former. It is celebrated annually on 28 Iyar on the Hebrew calendar, and is marked officially throughout Israel with state ceremonies and memorial services.

A notable celebrations that marks the holiday is a flag-flying parade known as the Dance of Flags. The Chief Rabbinate of Israel declared Jerusalem Day to be a minor religious holiday, as it marks the regaining for Jewish people of access to the Western Wall.

Historical background 

Under the 1947 United Nations Partition Plan for Palestine, which proposed the establishment of two states in British Mandatory Palestine – a Jewish state and an Arab state – Jerusalem was to be an international city, neither exclusively Arab nor Jewish for a period of ten years, at which point a referendum would be held by Jerusalem residents to determine which country to join. The Jewish leadership accepted the plan, including the internationalization of Jerusalem, but the Arabs rejected the proposal.

A civil war between Jewish forces and Palestinian Arabs in Mandatory Palestine internationalized in to the 1948 Arab–Israeli War the day after Israel declared independence and the surrounding Arab states sent their armies in to the former Mandate territory. Jordan captured East Jerusalem and the Old City while Israel captured the western section of the city. Israeli forces made a concerted attempt to dislodge the Jordanians but were unable to do so, and the war concluded with Jerusalem divided between Israel and Jordan by the Green Line. The Old City and the rest of East Jerusalem, along with the entirety of the West Bank, was occupied by Jordan, who forced the Jewish residents out, while the Palestinian Arab residents of western Jerusalem, at the time one of the more prosperous Arab communities, fled widespread looting and attacks by the Haganah, going from 28,000 to fewer than 750 remaining. Under Jordanian rule, half of the Old City's 58 synagogues were demolished and the Jewish cemetery on the Mount of Olives was plundered for its tombstones, which were used as paving stones and building materials.

In 1967, in the Six-Day War, Israel captured and occupied East Jerusalem and the rest of the West Bank from Jordan on 7 June 1967. Later that day, Defense Minister Moshe Dayan declared what is often quoted during Jerusalem Day:

The war ended with a ceasefire on 11 June 1967 with Israel in control of the entirety of territory of Mandatory Palestine, including all of Jerusalem. On 30 July 1980, the Knesset officially approved the Jerusalem Law, which called the city the complete and united capital.

Celebrations 
On 12 May 1968, the government proclaimed a new holiday – Jerusalem Day – to be celebrated on the 28th of Iyar, the Hebrew date on which the divided city of Jerusalem became one. On 23 March 1998, the Knesset passed the Jerusalem Day Law, making the day a national holiday.

One of the themes of Jerusalem Day, based on a verse from the Psalms, is "Built-up Jerusalem is like a city that was joined together" (Psalm 122:3).

In 1977, the government advanced the date of Jerusalem Day by a week to avoid it clashing with Election Day.

In 2015, Yad Sarah a non-profit volunteer organization began organizing a special tour specifically for residents who use wheelchairs, which focuses on Jerusalem history.

50th anniversary 

In 2017, the golden jubilee of Jerusalem Day was celebrated. During the course of the year many events marking this milestone took place in celebrations of the 50th Jerusalem Day. Many events were planned throughout the year, marking the jubilee. The main theme of the celebrations is the "Liberation of Jerusalem".  The celebrations began during Hanukkah 2016, at an official ceremony held at the City of David National Park in the presence of Minister Miri Regev, who is responsible for the celebrations marking the 50th anniversary. A logo was created for the jubilee and presented by the minister Miri Regev.

Events During the Jubilee Year 
The ceremony was held at the City of David National Park at the event the ancient "Pilgrims' Route", that led from the City of David to the Temple Mount during the Second Temple period, was unveiled. The ceremony was attended by Knesset members, mayors and the three paratroopers that were photographed by David Rubinger at the Western Wall in 1967. At the event, the Minister Miri Regev was quoted by the press as saying, "Mr. President Barack Obama, I am standing here, on Hanukka, on the same road on which my forefathers walked 2,000 years ago... No resolution in any international forum is as strong as the steadfast stones on this street." Noting several of the 14 countries that participated in the resolution – including New Zealand, Ukraine, Senegal, and Malaysia – the minister added, "no other people in the world has such a connection and link to their land."

Significance 

While the day is not widely celebrated outside Israel, and has lost its significance for most secular Israelis, the day is still very much celebrated by Israel's Religious Zionist community with parades and additional prayers in the synagogue.

Religious observance 
Religious Zionists recite special holiday prayers with Hallel. Although Rabbi Joseph B. Soloveitchik was reluctant to authorise its inclusion in the liturgy, other scholars, namely Meshulam Roth and others who held positions in the Israeli rabbinate, advocated the reciting of Hallel with its blessings, regarding it as a duty to do so. Today, various communities follow differing practices.

Some Haredim (strictly Orthodox), who do not recognise the religious significance of the State of Israel, do not observe Yom Yerushalayim. Rabbi Moshe Feinstein maintained that adding holidays to the Jewish calendar was itself problematic.

In 2015, Koren Publishers Jerusalem published a machzor dedicated to observance of Jerusalem Day and Independence Day.

Controversy 
There has been controversy pertaining to the celebration of Jerusalem Day. The settlement of Eastern Jerusalem and the claim of Jerusalem as a capital for the State of Israel is controversial among the left wing and the Arab population of Jerusalem, who regard it as a day marking the conquest of the West Bank and the Gaza Strip.

One of the celebrations marking Jerusalem Day is a youth parade with flags known as Dance of Flags, which begins at Gan Sacher, winds through the streets of downtown Jerusalem, threads through the old city and ends with a gathering for a final prayer at the Western Wall. The parade is controversial, and violent interactions have been reported between Arabs and Israeli youth during the procession.

In 2014, the Meretz political party submitted a bill to repeal the Jerusalem Day Law.

In May 2015, the Israeli High Court of Justice rejected a petition to prevent the Jerusalem Day parade from marching through the Muslim sector of the city. The justices said, however, that police must arrest parade participants who shout racist and violent epithets such as "Death to the Arabs!" or commit violent acts.

Ethiopian Jews' Memorial Day 

A ceremony is held on Yom Yerushalayim to commemorate the Beta Israel who perished on their way to Israel. In 2004, the Israeli government decided to turn this ceremony into a state ceremony held at the memorial site for Ethiopian Jews who perished on their way to Israel on Mount Herzl.

See also 
 History of Jerusalem
 Independence Day (Israel)
 Beit Orot

References

External links 

 
 Education week 9–13.5 – 43rd Jerusalem Day
 Jerusalem Day on the official Knesset website
 Overview: Yom Yerushalayim (Jerusalem Day) in My Jewish Learning website
 "Jerusalem in International Diplomacy" from the Jerusalem Center for Public Affairs

1968 establishments in Israel
Hallel
Day
Iyar observances
Day
Minor Jewish holidays
Public holidays in Israel
Recurring events established in 1968
Remembrance days
Unity days